The Springfield Pics are an American junior ice hockey organization playing in West Springfield, Massachusetts at the Olympia Ice Center. They field two Tier III teams and a number of Youth teams.

History
The franchise was founded as the Springfield Olympics (or Pics for short) as charter member of the Tier III Junior A Eastern Junior Hockey League (EJHL) in 1993. The team would relocate across the Massachusetts-Connecticut border to Enfield, Connecticut in 1995 and were renamed the New England Jr. Whalers named after the local National Hockey League team in Hartford. After the Hartford Whalers moved to Carolina in 1997, the franchise was renamed the New England Jr. Coyotes and later the Jr. Falcons after the local Springfield Falcons of the American Hockey League. During this time, the organization also fielded a team in the Tier III Empire Junior B Hockey League (EmJHL) (later the Empire Junior Hockey League).

In the 2009 off-season, the Jr. Falcons EJHL and EmJHL teams merged with the Springfield Pics of the Continental Hockey Association (CHA) and the Bay State Bucs Midget team, members of the NEMHL. This led the now merged Pics organization to field teams in the EJHL, EmJHL, and CHA.

USPHL Premier Division
In 2013, many Tier III junior hockey leagues were re-organized in the northeastern United States and the Springfield Pics became founding members of the new United States Premier Hockey League (USPHL). Their former Junior A team (USA Hockey dropped Junior A and B designations in 2011) which had participated in the EJHL joined the USPHL Elite Division for the 2013–14 season. In their first year in the USPHL-Elite League the Pics finished second and then went on to win the playoffs. The playoff win propelled the team to the 2014 USA Hockey Tier III Junior Nationals where they won their pool before losing the semifinal game to the eventual National Champions, the Boston Jr. Bruins. The Elite Division team was promoted to the Premier Division prior to the 2014–15 season.

USHPL USP3 Division
Their former Junior B team from the EmJHL joined the USPHL Empire Division for the 2013–14 season. In 2015, the Empire Division became the USP3 Division.

Former Junior B ESHL team
Their second Junior B team last competed in the Eastern States Hockey League (formerly the CHA). Following the 2013 re-organization, this team was eliminated in favor of Under 18 and Under 16 teams which play in corresponding USPHL leagues.

Season-by-season records

USA Hockey Tier III National Championships
Round robin play in pool with top 4 teams advancing to semifinal.

References

External links
 USPHL Web Site
 

1993 establishments in Massachusetts
Ice hockey clubs established in 1993
Ice hockey teams in Massachusetts
Junior ice hockey teams in the United States
Sports in Hampden County, Massachusetts
West Springfield, Massachusetts